Orajõe may refer to several places in Estonia:

Orajõe, Pärnu County, village in Häädemeeste Parish, Pärnu County
Orajõe, Põlva County, village in Põlva Parish, Põlva County